Jean Kirkpatrick may refer to:

Jeane Kirkpatrick (1926–2006), American diplomat
Jean Kirkpatrick (sociologist) (1926–2006), who founded Women For Sobriety